Dyschirius jindrai is a species of ground beetle in the subfamily Scaritinae. It was described by Fedorenko in 2004.

References

jindrai
Beetles described in 2004